Por Amor may refer to:

TV
 Por amor (1987 TV series), Argentine telenovela
 Por Amor (1997 TV series), Brazilian telenovela
 Por amor (2006 TV series), Colombian telenovela
 Por amor (Mexican TV series), Mexican telenovela
  (2005), Colombian telenovela
  (2008), Argentine TV programme
 Por tu amor (1999), Mexican telenovela

Music

Albums
 Por Amor (Menudo album), 1982
 Por Amor (Ricardo Arjona album), 2003
 Por Amor, Plácido Domingo

Songs
 "Por amor" (Rafael Solano song), 1968
 "Por amor" (Thalía song), 1998
 "Por amor", from Memorias 1976